Allen Maxwell Hodges  (11 February 191731 July 2009) was a member of the Queensland Legislative Assembly.

Early life
Hodges was born in Brisbane, Queensland, the son of Arthur John Hodges and his wife Helen Allen (née Mitchell). His great grandfather, William Mitchell, had represented the seat of Maryborough in the Queensland Legislative Assembly in 1904–1909. He was educated in Maryborough and on leaving school he did farm-related work.

During World War II he served in the 2nd AIF, being stationed at New Guinea and Borneo, and was discharged in 1946 at the rank of staff sergeant.

Hodges married Rita Fox Currant on 19 December 1939 and together had a son and two daughters. Rita died in 1969 and he then married Pamela Helen Hayward (died 1978) on 23 April 1973.

Public life

Hodges, a member of the Country Party, won the seat of Nash at the 1957 Queensland state election. The seat was renamed Gympie at the 1960 state election, and he went on to represent it until he retired from politics in 1979.

He held many positions in parliament including:
 Member of the Parliamentary Printing Committee 1957–1960
 Member of the Parliamentary Building Committee 1960–1962 
 Temporary Chairman of Committees  1963–1968  
 Minister for Works and Housing 1968–1974 
 Minister for Works and Housing and Minister for Police 1974–1975
 Minister for Police and Leader of the House 1975–1976
 Minister for Tourism and Maritime Services 1976–1979

Not long after being promoted to the role of Police Minister, Hodges appointed Ray Whitrod with a view to cleaning up the corruption in the police force. He found himself clashing with the Premier on issues, and eighteen months after being made Police Minister he was removed from the portfolio.

Later life
Hodges died in July 2009 at New Farm in Brisbane and was buried in the Gympie Cemetery.

References

Members of the Queensland Legislative Assembly
1917 births
2009 deaths
National Party of Australia members of the Parliament of Queensland
20th-century Australian politicians